The Young Lion is an historical novel by Blanche d'Alpuget. It is set in the 12th century and is the first in a future quartet about the Plantagenet dynasty which reigned in the Middle Ages. The book tells the story of Eleanor of Aquitaine and the restless and bold Henry Plantagenet, who later became Henry II of England.

Plot summary

The story begins with the return of Eleanor of Aquitaine from the Crusades with her monkish husband, Louis of France. Historically Eleanor was famous for her beauty and a contemporary poet described her as "gracious, lovely, the embodiment of charm". She begins an affair with Geoffrey, Duke of Normandy, who has a secret motive to make her his spy in the French court.

Although Geoffrey has ulterior intents, their affair becomes passionate. He remains, however, committed to his goal of ensuring that his son Henry becomes King of England. The relationship between Eleanor and Henry begins badly, and Henry falls in love with Eleanor's dazzling Byzantine maid. The maid would be unsuitable as queen if Henry should assume the English throne.

These complex relationships and intrigues are the basis of this story which is set in 12th century France, a century characterised by the flowering of troubadour culture, mysticism, and learning.

Reviews

The book received favourable reviews, with Books and Publishing, a literary magazine, reporting that:

A review published in The Australian commented:

References

External links
Link to an extract from the book
HarperCollins' webpage

Historical novels
Novels set in the Middle Ages
Romance (genre)
2013 Australian novels
Australian romance novels
HarperCollins books